Catherine Terracini (born c. 1982) is an Australian actress and producer born in Lake Como, Italy. She is the daughter of opera singer and artistic director of Opera Australia, Lyndon Terracini and arts administrator Elizabeth Terracini. Catherine is a graduate of the National Institute of Dramatic Art (NIDA) and has been working in Australian theatre, film and television and commercials since 2004.

Early life 
Terracini was born in Italy to Australian parents living in Palanzo, near the village of Como. They then returned to their home country in 1987, settling in the town of Lismore, New South Wales. She attended high school at Trinity Catholic College before being accepted to the Acting Degree Program at NIDA in Sydney one year after graduating high school.

Career 
Terracini has worked in theatre, film, television and commercials since graduating from NIDA. In 2010 she performed in the play Bug by Pulitzer Prize-Winning American writer Tracy Letts for Griffin Independent and won the award for Best Actress at Brisbane International Film Festival's Warner Roadshow New Filmmaker's Awards in 2009 for the Short Film Let Go.

In 2012 she was awarded a Mike Walsh Fellowship. Terracini is a Dame Joan Sutherland Fund recipient from the American Australian Association which allowed her to study with The Barrow Group in New York City in 2013.

In 2019 she was appointed creative producer by the effect and animation house Heckler.

References

External links 
 
 Profil, stage and film credits, showcast.com.au
 
 Profile at Whittemore Management
 Sydney Morning Herald review: Colder
 Chris Boyd Review: The Cold Child
 

Living people
1982 births
National Institute of Dramatic Art alumni
Actresses from New South Wales
Australian film actresses
Australian television actresses
Australian stage actresses